David Vivian Penrose Lewis, 1st Baron Brecon PC (14 August 1905 – 10 October 1976) was a Welsh businessman and Conservative politician.

Background and education
Lewis was the son of Alfred William Lewis, of Talybont-on-Usk, Breconshire, and was educated at Monmouth School.

Political career
In December 1957 he was appointed Minister of State for Welsh Affairs by Prime Minister Harold Macmillan, and the following January he was raised to the peerage as Baron Brecon, of Llanfeigan in the County of Brecknock. He was admitted to the Privy Council in 1960 and remained Minister of State for Welsh Affairs until 1964, from 1963 to 1964 under the premiership of Sir Alec Douglas-Home.

Family
Lord Brecon married Mabel Helen, daughter of James McColville, in 1933. They had two daughters. Lady Brecon was a Justice of the Peace for Breconshire and High Sheriff of the county for 1971. In 1964 she was made a CBE. Lord Brecon died in October 1976, aged 71. As he had no sons the title became extinct on his death. Lady Brecon survived her husband by almost thirty years and died in September 2005, aged 96.

Notes

References

Arms of David Lewis, 1st Baron Brecon, at hereditarytitles.com

1905 births
1976 deaths
MEPs for the United Kingdom 1973–1979
Members of the Privy Council of the United Kingdom
Ministers in the Macmillan and Douglas-Home governments, 1957–1964
People educated at Monmouth School for Boys
Welsh Conservative MEPs
Hereditary barons created by Elizabeth II